Lita is a female given name of Latin origin, which means "gladly". The name can be a diminutive form of Amelita, Elita, or Lolita. The name Lita may refer to:

People
Lita (wrestler) (born 1975), American wrestler
Lita Cabellut (born 1961), Spanish painter
Lita Chevret (1908–2001), American actress 
Lita Cohen (born 1940), American politician
Lita Ford (born 1958), American musician
Lita Grey (1908–1995), American actress
Lita Liem Sugiarto (born 1946), Indonesian tennis player
Lita Prahl (1905–1978), Norwegian actress 
Lita Roza (1926–2008), British singer
Lita Stantic (born 1942), Argentine filmmaker

Fiction
Lita, fictional character in the video game series Boktai
Lita Kino, fictional character in the Sailor Moon anime and manga series

See also

Lota (name)

Latin feminine given names